Ephialtias choba is a moth of the family Notodontidae first described by Herbert Druce in 1899. It is found in the lower Amazon of Brazil.

External links
"Ephialtias choba (Druce 1899)". Tree of Life Web Project. Retrieved December 28, 2019.

Notodontidae of South America
Moths described in 1899